"The Animal" is a song by American heavy metal band Disturbed. It was released on October 4, 2010, as the third single from their studio album, Asylum. According to vocalist David Draiman, "The Animal" was heavily inspired by the movie The Wolfman (2010).

Music video
A music video for "The Animal", directed by Charlie Terrell, premiered on 16 November 2010, on MTV2. It was the first music video from the album Asylum to feature all the band members, as "Another Way to Die" did not feature any of them and "Asylum" only featured lead singer David Draiman. The video also features Draiman's then-fiancée and former WWE Diva Lena Yada.

Charts

Weekly charts

Year-end charts

Personnel
 David Draiman – lead vocals, backing vocals
 Dan Donegan – guitars, electronics
 John Moyer – bass guitar, backing vocals
 Mike Wengren – drums, percussion

References

2010 singles
Disturbed (band) songs
2010 songs
Reprise Records singles
Songs written by Dan Donegan
Songs written by David Draiman
Songs written by Mike Wengren